Li Wen (born 21 February 1989) is a Chinese footballer currently playing as a midfielder for Dalian.

Career statistics

International

References

1989 births
Living people
Chinese women's footballers
China women's international footballers
Women's association football midfielders
Dalian Quanjian F.C. players
2019 FIFA Women's World Cup players